= Scottish Value Management =

Scottish Value Management is a fund manager based in Edinburgh. The firm was founded in 1990 by Colin McLean, his wife Margaret Lawson, and Donald Robertson.
