= Colin McLean =

Scottish fund manager

Colin McLean (born c. 1953) is a Scottish fund manager who was the co-founder with his wife Margaret Lawson, and Donald Robertson, of Scottish Value Management.
